Switch-associated protein 70 is a protein that in humans and other mammals  is encoded by the SWAP70 gene.

References

Further reading